Dezső is a Hungarian given male name, the Hungarian form of  Desiderius. It may refer to:

People
Dezső Bánffy, Hungarian politician
Dezső Ernster, Hungarian opera singer
Dezső Földes, Hungarian 2x Olympic champion saber fencer
Dezső Kanizsai, Hungarian audiologist
Dezső Kosztolányi, Hungarian poet and writer
 Dezső Ránki, Hungarian concert pianist
Dezső Vaghy, Hungarian violinist (of the Vaghy String Quartet)

See also
3892 Dezsö, a main belt asteroid

Hungarian masculine given names